Hakim Sid (born 2 July 1975), better known by his stage name Demon One, is a French rapper of Algerian origin.

Hakim Sid was born Choisy-le-Roi, Val-de-Marne of an Algerian father and a French mother started rapping at a very young age. He was friends with M.S. (Mansa Konaté). He is a founding member of Intouchable alongside Dry (real name Landry Delica).

Demon One made his first appearance with Dry, M.S. in 1994. In 1996, Intouchable became part of the rap collective Mafia K-1 Fry. In 1997, Mamad joined Intouchable.

Demon One appeared with some solo work in the second album of Ideal J Le combat continue in 1998 with the track "L'amour". In 2000, Intouchable released their debut album Les points sur les I and started a tour with rap band 113.

Demon One also released solo tracks on various Mafia K-1 Fry projects. In 2005, Intouchable released their second studio album La vie de rêve. Thanks to the track "La gagne" with Tonton David, Intouchable gained a lot of fame.

In 2007, Demon One launched "Votez pour moi" (meaning vote for me). In June 2007, he released his solo street album Mon rap with many unpublished tracks most notably "Monsieur le Maire" addressed to mayor of Choisy-le-Roi. In January 2008, he returned with a full studio album Démons et merveilles.

In November 2011, he announced his withdrawal from the Mafia K'1 Fry collective.

Demon One's biggest hit in France was the 2008 single "J'étais comme eux" featuring Soprano.

Discography

Albums, Mixtapes
Solo - Demon One

As Intouchable
2000 : Les points sur les I
2001 : I Have a Dream (maxi)
2004 : Original Mix-Tape (mixtape)
2005 : La vie de rêve

In collective Mafia K'1 Fry
1997 : Les liens sacrés
1999 : Légendaire
2003 : La cerise sur le ghetto
2007 : Jusqu'à la mort

Singles

Appearances
Main
2001: Demon One - "Une histoire" in compilation Vitry club
2003: Demon One feat OGB - "Freestyle" in the mixtape Pur son ghetto Vol. 2
2004: Demon One - "La rue c'est moi" in the compilation Talents fâchés 2
2005: 113 feat Demon One - "C'est même pas la peine" in the 113 album 113 degrés
2005: Demon One - "Le feu dans le ghetto" in the compilation Police partout justice nulle part
2006: Demon One - "La rage" in the compilation Phonographe 
2009: Demon One feat L.I.M, Selim du 9.4 & Boulox Force - "La danse des lears-dea" in the compilation Street lourd 2 hall stars
Featured in
2005: Sté Strausz feat Demon One & Alibi Montana - "Pour l'argent" in the Sté Strausz album Fidèle à moi-même
2007: Al K-Pote feat Demon One - "Banlieues chaudes" in the Street CD of Al K-Pote, Sucez-moi avant l'album

References

External links
SkyRock Dry page
LastFM

French rappers
1975 births
Living people
French people of Algerian descent
Rappers from Val-de-Marne